

Berakah is a UK-based musical ensemble featuring musicians from Jewish, Christian and Muslim faith backgrounds. Founded in July 2005 it is the first project of its kind in the UK to explicitly draw its musical personnel from their faith heritage. According to its founder, guitarist and composer Mohammed Nazam, this was done to show people from different religious communities with a history of tension, co-operating and working together in a positive light, against a background of growing unrest as a result of the New York 9/11 attacks and the London 7/7 bombings.

The ideology behind the band was to use music to transcend barriers of religion, race and culture as well as encouraging peace and compassion for all human beings. In 1997 Berakah was given huge support by The Arts Council of Great Britain which enabled them to perform extensively across the UK. In 1997 they released their debut album "Music for The Heart" which featured compositions fusing Jazz, Classical and Middle Eastern influences.

"The aims of the band are to make good music! But also, through the music and the songs, to encourage non-violence, peaceful coexistence, dialogue between people of differing faiths; to raise awareness of common roots of the three main monotheistic faiths and the celebration of diversity. The real aim though, is to draw audiences from the three faiths so that Jews, Muslims and Christians can sit with each other and enjoy a cultural event and maybe even strike up a conversation. Who knows what could happen then? Some of them might realise that the images they had of the other may have been slightly ill-advised and might actually start talking to each other! Having said that I have to make it clear that Berakah can be enjoyed, and is relevant to, people of faith, people of little faith and those of no faith whatsoever!"

Concerts are held in major music venues such as The Purcell Room's in London's Southbank Centre, but also in places of worship so as to draw people of differing faiths into a place usually associated with another community, therefore helping to build bridges and increase understanding between people's, with music as the facilitating element. To this end, concerts have been held in synagogues (Harrow and North West London Progressive Synagogue, London), churches (St Paul's, Covent Garden, St. Anne's Queens Park) and Muslim community Centres (Southwark Muslim Women's Community Centre).

Although dealing with issues of faith the group and its organisational structure are avowedly progressive and liberal, as shown by their Mission Statement which makes it clear that it is a secular organisation, in keeping with the ideals of its founder. To this end, although the musicians are all drawn from a cultural and religious heritage some of them are "observant" or "practicing" and some are not.

.

Mohammed Nazam's work with Berakah led to an invitation to take part in projects based in Israel/Palestine in 2005 and 2009. In 2005 Nazam took part in music workshops with young Palestinians in the West Bank and young Israelis in Tel Aviv

In 2009 Nazam took part in a project devised by Israeli peace organisation 'Windows For Peace', which saw young Jewish Israelis and Israeli citizens of Palestinian descent working together to produce a song and an accompanying video.

Mohammed Nazam, in an interview With One Jerusalem on 16 June 2009, gives further insight into the Windows For Peace Project:

“It’s important that during challenging times like these the people and organisations who are working for peace step up a gear and show the world that there are ways of increasing understanding and crossing religious, national and cultural divides. The work that Windows for Peace are doing with Israelis and Palestinians is incredibly important and I am touched and honoured to have been asked by  Robert Cowan, founder of Point Blank (Point Blank Music College), to be involved in this initiative; I absolutely believe that no matter what, hatred and war are truly not viable options." 

Point Blank, is a frequent visitor to the Middle East; four years ago Robert Cowan formulated an idea for using the Point Blank training system to engage young people from Israel and Palestine and bring them together through music and film-making.

Band 
 Guitar: Mohammed Nazam
 Vocals: Chantelle Duncan
 Keyboards: Mark Hinton Stewart
 Acoustic Bass: Eustace William
 Violin: Serena Leader
 Percussion: Abdelkader Saadoun

References

External links 
 Berakah web site
 MySpace
 Windows For Peace

British session musicians